Newport Corinthians Football Club is an association football team based in the city of Newport, South Wales. They  currently play in the Gwent County League.

History
Newport Corinthians AFC was formed in 1961 by two friends, Alan Merton and Hedley Morgan as they wanted to play football together along with their friends and family. 
The club started off with humble beginnings, playing out of various pubs and clubs in the Newport and District League. Tredegar Park, Duffryn and Alfa Steel were pitches and parks used before finally settling at Coronation Park. 
With just a pitch and a small blue shed the club were determined to grow and establish its roots as a Football Club in Newport. During these years, The Corries had great success in the District and Gwent County Leagues as well as the domestic cups. As a result of this, in 1990 the current clubhouse was built to match the accomplishments that were made on the field. 
Today, the club boast 3 Senior sides and a whole Junior section dedicated to playing attacking football in the right way, The Corries way with friendship as the basis for all of the teams. 
Moving into the future Newport Corinthians AFC wants to continue creating those great memories through football and maintain the status of a thriving club that serves the communities in Newport as it has done for almost 60 years. 
The club would not be where it is without its Committee members, players and parents who all volunteer their time, skills and effort to try and reach the goal to be one of the best clubs in South Wales.

In 2021, the Newport band Goldie Lookin Chain sponsored the team in their 60th anniversary season.

Honours
Gwent County League Division Two – Champions: 2012–13; 2019–20
Gwent County League Division Two – Runners-up: 2001–02

External links
Official Club twitter
Official club facebook

References

Football clubs in Wales
Gwent County League clubs
Association football clubs established in 1961
1961 establishments in Wales
Football clubs in Newport, Wales